Vincent is a masculine given name.

Vincent may also refer to:

Places

Australia 
Vincent, Queensland, a suburb of Townsville, Australia
City of Vincent, a local government area of Western Australia

United States 
Vincent, Alabama, a city
Vincent, California, a census designated place
Vincent, Iowa, a city
Vincent, Kansas, an unincorporated community
Vincent, Kentucky
Vincent, Ohio
Port Vincent, Louisiana, a village

Elsewhere
 Vincent, Jura, France, a commune
 Vincent, Sud, Haiti, a village

People with the name
Vincent (actor), Indian actor from Kerala during the 1970s and 1980s in Malayalam films
Vincent (music producer) (born 1995), Canadian electronic music producer and pianist
Vincent (surname)

Arts, entertainment, and media

Films
Vincent (1982 film), a 1982 stop-motion short film by Tim Burton
Vincent (1987 film), a documentary film by Australian director Paul Cox

Music
"Vincent" (Don McLean song), by Don McLean as a tribute to Vincent Van Gogh, 1971
"Vincent" (Sarah Connor song), by Sarah Connor, 2019
"Vincent", a song by Car Seat Headrest from Teens of Denial, 2016

Other uses in arts, entertainment, and media
Vincent (novel) or Torture the Artist, a novel by Joey Goebel
Vincent (opera), a 1990 opera by Einojuhani Rautavaara
Vincent (TV series), a television series on ITV1
Goram and Vincent, legendary giants in the folklore of Bristol, UK

Brands and enterprises
Vincent Aviation, an airline in Wellington, New Zealand
Vincent Motorcycles, a defunct British motorcycle manufacturer

Other uses
Vickers Vincent, a British biplane introduced in 1933
Vincent Club, a private women's organization founded in 1892 to support the Vincent Memorial Hospital of Boston
, a United States Navy patrol boat in commission from 1917 or 1918 to 1919

See also
Saint Vincent (disambiguation)
Vince (disambiguation)
Vincentia (disambiguation)

de:Vinzenz
tr:Vincent#Kişiler